Javier Verme Villaran (born March 30, 1974) is a former Peruvian sprinter who competed in the men's 100m competition at the 1996 Summer Olympics. He recorded a 10.91, not enough to qualify for the next round past the heats. His personal best is 10.54, set the same year at the Iberoamerican Championships in Medellin, Colombia.

He is still the Peruvian National record holder for 200m indoor, 21.98s set on March 7, 1997 at the Indoor World Championships, Paris, France.

References

1974 births
Peruvian male sprinters
Athletes (track and field) at the 1996 Summer Olympics
Olympic athletes of Peru
Living people